LifeSouth Community Blood Centers is a not-for-profit blood bank incorporated in Florida.  LifeSouth is headquartered in Gainesville, Florida, and serves over 125 hospitals in Florida, Georgia and Alabama.  It has formerly been known as Civitan Regional Blood Centers.

History 

In 1974, hospitals were in critical need of volunteer blood donors after the FDA curtailed the practice of paying donors for blood donations. Gainesville, Florida hospitals (Alachua General Hospital, UF Health Shands Hospital and North Florida Regional Medical Center) all agreed that a non-profit community blood center was the answer and made an appeal to all local civic organizations. The Gainesville Civitan Club was the only organization that agreed to take on this task. Members backed a loan with their own money to start what they called Civitan Regional Blood Center – today known as LifeSouth Community Blood Centers.

For the past 40 years, LifeSouth has grown at the request of hospitals in need of a community blood supplier.

Today, LifeSouth has close to 1,000 employees and operates as a 501(c)(3) nonprofit organization overseeing an annual budget of nearly $80 million.

Foundations and affiliates

LifeSouth Community Foundation 
LifeSouth Community Foundation is a support affiliate of LifeSouth Community Blood Centers, a nonprofit 501(c)(3) charitable organization. The LifeSouth Community Foundation educates and raises awareness of the ways to share life with others through the donation of blood, apheresis, marrow, cord blood, organ and tissue. The Foundation works to educate citizens about donation.

LifeSouth Cord Blood Bank 
LifeSouth Cord Blood Bank is a community-based public cord blood bank that collects and stores umbilical cord blood for the purpose of clinical cures and basic research in the field of stem cell transplantation. LifeSouth Cord Blood Bank participates in the network of public cord blood banks affiliated with the National Marrow Donor Program’s Be The Match Registry and the Center for International Blood and Marrow Transplant Research. LifeSouth Cord Blood Bank is a program of LifeSouth Community Blood Centers which performs community and donor education, cord blood collection and processing, distribution of the cord blood units, and evaluation of transplant outcomes.

References 

Blood banks in the United States
Medical and health organizations based in Florida